Gilbert de Clare, 4th Earl of Hertford, 5th Earl of Gloucester, 1st Lord of Glamorgan, 7th Lord of Clare (1180 – 25 October 1230) was the son of Richard de Clare, 3rd Earl of Hertford (c. 1153–1217), from whom he inherited the Clare estates. He also inherited from his mother, Amice Fitz William, the estates of Gloucester and the honour of St. Hilary, and from Rohese, an ancestor, the moiety of the Giffard estates. In June 1202, he was entrusted with the lands of Harfleur and Montrevillers.

Life 

In 1215, Gilbert and his father were two of the barons made Magna Carta sureties and championed Louis "le Dauphin" of France in the First Barons' War, fighting at Lincoln under the baronial banner. He was taken prisoner in 1217 by William Marshal, whose daughter Isabel he later married on 9 October, her 17th birthday. 

In 1223, he accompanied his brother-in-law, Earl Marshal, in an expedition into Wales. In 1225 he was present at the confirmation of Magna Carta by Henry III. In 1228, he led an army against the Welsh, capturing Morgan Gam, who was released the next year. 

He then joined in an expedition to Brittany, but died on his way back to Penrose in that duchy. His body was conveyed home by way of Plymouth and Cranborne to Tewkesbury. His own arms were: Or, three chevronels gules.

Issue 
Gilbert de Clare had six children by his wife Isabel Marshal, great-grandmother of King Robert the Bruce:
Agnes de Clare (b. 1218)
Amice de Clare (1220–1287), who married Baldwin de Redvers, 6th Earl of Devon
Richard de Clare, 6th Earl of Gloucester (1222–1262)
Isabel de Clare (1226–1264), who married Robert de Brus, 5th Lord of Annandale
William de Clare (1228–1258)
Gilbert de Clare (b. 1229)

His widow Isabel later married the King of the Romans &  Earl of Cornwall, Richard Plantagenet, of the House of Plantagenet.

Arms

Footnotes

References 
Ancestral Roots of Certain American Colonists Who Came to America Before 1700 by Frederick Lewis Weis, Lines: 54–30, 63–28, 63–29

1180 births
1230 deaths
Gloucester, Gilbert de Clare, 5th Earl of
De Clare family
12th-century English nobility
13th-century English nobility
Earls of Gloucester
Earls of Hertford
Burials at Tewkesbury Abbey
Lords of Glamorgan